Guillermo Durán and Andrés Molteni are the defending champions, but only Molteni defended his title partnering José Hernández.

Julio Peralta and Horacio Zeballos won the title, defeating Sergio Galdós and Luis David Martínez 6–2, 6–2 in the final.

Seeds

Draw

References
 Main Draw

2016 ATP Challenger Tour
2016 Doubles